was a manga writing duo formed by Japanese manga artists  and . They formed their partnership in 1951, and used the Fujiko Fujio name from 1954 until dissolution of the partnership in 1987, upon Fujimoto's illness. The pair was best known for their popular comedies, including Obake no Q-Tarō, Ninja Hattori-kun, Kaibutsu-kun, and Doraemon, the main character of which is officially recognized as a cultural icon of modern Japan.

Some influences of most of their projects are the works of acclaimed manga artist Osamu Tezuka and many US cartoons and comic books—including the works of Hanna-Barbera.

Biography
Hiroshi Fujimoto and Motoo Abiko were both from Toyama Prefecture. Fujimoto was born on December 1, 1933, and Abiko on March 10, 1934. Abiko transferred to Fujimoto's elementary school in Takaoka City and happened to see Fujimoto drawing in a notebook. The two became lifelong friends, and during the early years of their friendship kept their illustrations hidden from friends and classmates out of embarrassment.

In junior high school they were greatly influenced by Osamu Tezuka and his manga series Shin Takarajima. Fujimoto built a homemade episcope and together they wrote a piece for it called Tenküma, which was their first collaborative work. They started submitting work to periodicals such as Manga Shōnen and opened a joint savings account through Japan Post to which they both contributed funds and which they used to purchase art supplies. They divided all income and expenses equally between each other, a practice they continued throughout the life of their partnership.

In high school they made their publishing debut, Tenshi no Tama-chan being adopted for serialization by Mainichi Shogakusei Shimbun in 1951. That same year they paid a visit to Tezuka's residence in Takarazuka, Hyōgo and showed him illustrations for their work titled Ben Hur. Tezuka complimented the two, some years later commenting that he knew then they were going to be major figures in the manga industry. Abiko and Fujimoto treasured the meeting with the respected Tezuka, and kept the Ben Hur illustrations for their entire lives. It was at this time they decided to make their partnership permanent, initially adopting the name Tezuka Fujio out of respect, later changing this to Azhizuka Fujio when they perceived adoption of the Tezuka name as too close to that of their idol.

Because both Fujimoto and Abiko were eldest sons respectively, they decided to take company jobs after graduating from high school in 1952. Fujimoto found employment with a confectionery company, and Abiko began working for the Toyama Newspaper Company. However, Fujimoto suffered a workplace injury when an arm was caught in machinery, and he quit within a matter of days. Fujimoto then dedicated his time to submitting work to periodicals, with Abiko assisting him on the weekends. Their first serial as Ashizuka Fujio was terminated in a few episodes, followed by success with the post-apocalyptic science fiction series .

They elected to move to Tokyo in 1954 as professional manga artists at Fujimoto's urging, Abiko only reluctantly as he had steady employment at the Toyama Newspaper Company. Their first place of residence was a two-tatami mat room at the second floor of a watch shop. They eventually moved to the Tokiwa-sō apartment complex when Tezuka offered them a room that he was moving out of. Together with Hiroo Terada and several other manga artists of the period, they formed a collaborative group called . At the apartment complex where the group was based, they enjoyed a period of productivity that had Fujimoto and Abiko carry up to six serials a month for publication. Additionally, Abiko contributed to Tezuka's works as an artist assistant, such as drawing a blizzard on the last page of Jungle Emperor.

The workload proved excessive, and in 1955 on return to Toyama for Japanese New Year the pair missed all the deadlines for their serials. The loss of credibility with publishers hurt Fujimoto and Abiko for over a year, during which time they concentrated on solo projects, purchasing a television set in Akihabara and making independent films with an 8mm camera. By 1959 they left Tokiwa-sō and eventually moved to Kawasaki in Kanagawa Prefecture. In the 1960s Fujimoto and Abiko founded Fujiko Studio Co., Ltd., a joint manga production company. Fujimoto found time to get married in 1962, at the age of 28.

In 1963 Fujimoto and Abiko established Studio Zero with Shin'ichi Suzuki, Shotaro Ishinomori, Jirō Tsunoda and Kiyoichi Tsunoda. Later Fujio Akatsuka joined, and at its peak the studio employed about 80 people. The studio produced several animated films such as Astro Boy. For Fujimoto and Abiko these were some of their most productive years, resulting in series such as Obake no Q-Tarō which eventually were made into anime series on television. It was at this time that Abiko started making manga for a more mature audience, with titles such as Teresa Tang and Kuroi Salesman. Abiko got married in 1966 at the age of 32. Fujimoto concentrated on titles for children, with a particular interest in science fiction.

Doraemon was created in 1969 and immediately surged in popularity with children in Japan. CoroCoro Comic released its first issue in 1977 to showcase the works of Fujiko Fujio. With syndication of Doraemon on TV Asahi in 1979, a surge of popularity saw up to a dozen collaborative and solo works by Fujimoto and Abiko picked up for publication and syndication throughout the 1980s. Doraemon is the only work by the duo to ever get an official release in English-speaking countries, most notably the United States. But English dubs of work such as Perman and Ninja Hattori-kun aired in Asia.

In 1987, citing creative differences, Fujimoto and Abiko ended their long partnership to concentrate on solo projects. From now on, Abiko would work at Fujiko Studio K.K. and Fujimoto in Fujiko F. Fujio Pro K.K.

Abiko adopted the pen name Fujiko A. Fujio, while his former partner wrote under the pseudonym Fujiko F. Fujio.

Abiko concentrated on work incorporating more black humor while Fujimoto focused on works for tweens. According to Abiko, the cause for the dissolution of the partnership was due to Fujimoto discovering he had liver cancer and heart disease in 1986, and the desire of both Fujimoto and Abiko to settle issues of copyright and finances before Fujimoto's death in 1996.

A documentary was aired on TV Asahi on February 19, 2006, chronicling the life and times of Fujiko Fujio.

A Fujiko F. Fujio museum opened in Kawasaki, Kanagawa on September 3, 2011, which features a reproduction of Fujio's studio and a display of their artwork.

Fujimoto died from liver failure in Shinjuku on September 23, 1996.

Abiko died at his home in Kawasaki on April 7, 2022.

Awards
 1963 – Shogakukan Manga Award for Old Song and Tebukuro Tecchan
 1981 – Kawasaki City's 
 1982 – Shogakukan Manga Award for children's manga
 1989 – 
 1989 – 
 1997 – The first Tezuka Osamu Cultural Prize Grand Prize

Works

Fujiko Fujio's works

Fujiko F. Fujio's works

Fujiko A. Fujio's works

Notes

References
Citations

Bibliography

External links
 Yahoo! カテゴリ – 漫画家 藤子不二雄 リンク切れ 
 Profile of Fujiko Fujio  at The Ultimate Manga Guide
 Profile of Fujiko F. Fujio at The Ultimate Manga Guide
 Profile of Fujiko A. Fujio  at The Ultimate Manga Guide
 Fujiko F. Fujio Museum in Tama Ward , Kawasaki

 
1933 births
1996 deaths
1934 births
2022 deaths
Fujiko Fujio
Collective pseudonyms
Manga artists from Toyama Prefecture
People from Toyama Prefecture
Pseudonymous artists